This is a list of prominent figures who contributed to Marxist theory, principally as authors; it is not intended to list politicians who happen(ed) to be a member of an ostensibly communist political party or other organisation.

See also 
 List of Marxian economists

References 

Marxist theory
Marxist theory
Marxist theory